Belgrade Zone League (Serbian: Зонска лига Београда / Zonska liga Beograda) is one of the Serbian Zone League divisions, the fourth tier of the Serbian football league system. It is run by the Football Association of Belgrade.

The league comprises 16 teams. The top two teams are promoted to the Serbian League Belgrade and the bottom two teams are relegated to the Belgrade First League.

Seasons

External links
 Football Association of Serbia
 Football Association of Belgrade

Serbian Zone League
Football in Belgrade